Mark Gregory Horo (born 27 March 1963) is a New Zealand rugby league coach and former footballer who played in the 1980s and 1990s. A New Zealand international representative, he played club football in New Zealand for Te Atatu and in Australia for Parramatta and Wests before finishing his career back in Auckland with the Warriors. Horo coached in New South Wales and is the co-coach of the New Zealand Māori team.

Background
His eldest son Justin Horo played for Catalans Dragaons & Wakefield Trinity in the Super League, Parramatta Eels & was part of the Manly-Warringah Sea Eagles team that played in the 2013 Grand Final loss to the Sydney Roosters.

Playing career
Horo played at the 1985-1988 Rugby League World Cup and the 1995 Rugby League World Cup. In New Zealand he played for the Te Atatu Roosters in the Auckland Rugby League competition and he later represented the Parramatta Eels, Western Suburbs Magpies and the Auckland Warriors in Australian competitions. He played for the New Zealand Māori side at the 1986 Pacific Cup.

Horo played  (replaced by interchange/substitute Mick McTigue) in Salford's 17–22 defeat by Wigan in the 1988 Lancashire County Cup Final during the 1988–89 season at Knowsley Road, St. Helens on Sunday 23 October 1988.

Horo played 16 tests for the Kiwis over a ten-year period. He had stunning start to his international career starring in a 13-6 upset win over Australia. He held his Kiwi spot in 1988 with his brother Shane Horo playing in the 66-14 win over Papua New Guinea and the 12-10 win over Great Britain at the Addington Show Grounds in Christchurch. The following year he played against Australia before missing the 1989 Kiwi Tour.

Horo regained his Kiwi spot in 1990 under a new Kiwi coach, however for the next four seasons injuries and being out of favour with Kiwi coaches resulted in him not being selected, including missing the Kiwi tour in 1993 (hindsight suggests he and other shock omission Tony Iro should have been selected).

After Parramatta
Having difficulties at Parramatta, Horo moved to Western Suburbs. Horo played superbly and in 1995 regained his test jersey playing in all three world cup internationals for the kiwis. Horo was signed by the warriors on a 2-year contract after which he retired.

Horo played his last international in 1996.

Later years
Mark Horo previously coached the Erina Eagles of the Jim Beam Cup.

In 2010, Horo was the co-coach of the New Zealand Māori side with Richie Blackmore.

Horo now coaches the Penrith Panthers S.G. Ball Cup squad.

Horo is now coaching A Grade at Glenmore Park Brumbies J.R.L.F.C

References

External links
World Cup 1995 details

Sources
 

1963 births
Living people
Auckland rugby league team players
New Zealand Māori rugby league players
New Zealand Māori rugby league team coaches
New Zealand Māori rugby league team players
New Zealand national rugby league team players
New Zealand expatriate sportspeople in Australia
New Zealand expatriate sportspeople in England
New Zealand rugby league coaches
New Zealand rugby league players
New Zealand Warriors players
Northern Districts rugby league team players
Parramatta Eels players
Rugby league second-rows
Salford Red Devils players
Te Atatu Roosters players
Waikato rugby league team players
Western Suburbs Magpies players